There is no god but God may refer to:

 The beginning of the shahada, the Muslim profession of faith
 Tawhid, the Muslim concept of the oneness and uniqueness of God
 No God but God: The Origins, Evolution, and Future of Islam, a 2005 book about Islam by Reza Aslan
 A Bill Kenny song sung by Elvis Presley on the album He Touched Me (album)